Yaopi is a former town in the middle east of Chaling County, Hunan, China.

As a historical division of Chaling, Yaopi Commune was created in 1961 from a part of Dongfeng Commune. The commune was reorganized as  a township in 1984, the township was reorganized as a town in 1990. In February 2007, Qidi Township and Hengwu Village of the historic Yaoshui Township were merged to Yaopi Town.

Yaopi Town was dissolved on November 20, 2015, while 24 villages and a community of the town were amalgamated to Yaolu Town. The other three villages were merged to Mijiang Subdistrict.

References

Historic township-level divisions of Chaling County